Osage High School may refer to:

Osage High School (Iowa), Osage, Iowa
Osage High School (Missouri), Osage Beach, Missouri
Osage City High School, Osage City, Kansas
Fort Osage High School, Independence, Missouri